The University of East Anglia (UEA) is a public research university in Norwich, England. Established in 1963 on a  campus west of the city centre, the university has four faculties and 26 schools of study. The annual income of the institution for 2021–22 was £295.5 million, of which £30.2 million was from research grants and contracts, with an expenditure of £370 million, and had an undergraduate offer rate of 85.1% in 2021.

UEA alumni and faculty include three Nobel laureates, a discoverer of Hepatitis C and of the Hepatitis D genome, a lead developer of the Oxford–AstraZeneca COVID-19 vaccine, one President of the Royal Society, and at least 48 Fellows of the Royal Society. Alumni also include heads of state, government and intergovernmental organisations, as well as three Booker Prize winning authors.

History

1960s

People in Norwich began to talk about the possibility of setting up a university in the nineteenth century, and attempts to establish one in Norwich were made in 1919 and 1947. But due to a lack of government funding on both occasions the plans had to be postponed. The University of East Anglia was eventually given the green light in April 1960 for biological sciences and English studies students. Initially, teaching took place in the temporary "University Village", which was officially opened by chairman of the University Grants Committee, Keith Murray, on 29 September 1963. Sited on the opposite side of the Earlham Road to the present campus, this was a collection of prefabricated structures designed for 1200 students, laid out by the local architectural firm Feilden and Mawson. There were no residences. The vice-chancellor and administration were based in nearby Earlham Hall.

In 1961, the first vice-chancellor, Frank Thistlethwaite, had approached Denys Lasdun, an adherent of the "New Brutalist" trend in architecture, who was at that time building Fitzwilliam College, Cambridge, to produce designs for the permanent campus. The site chosen was on the western edge of the city, on the south side of Earlham Road. The land, formerly part of the Earlham Hall estate was at that time occupied by a golf course. Lasdun unveiled a model and an outline plan at a press conference in April 1963, but it took another year to produce detailed plans, which diverged considerably from the model. The first buildings did not open until late 1966.

Alongside this he built a walkway, giving access to the various entrances of the wall, with access roads beneath. Attached to the other, southern, side of the walkway he added the groups of terraced residences that became known as "Ziggurats". In 1968, Lasdun was replaced as architect by Bernard Feilden, who completed the teaching wall and library and created an arena-shaped square as a social space of a kind not envisioned in his predecessor's plans. They would later become Grade II* listed status, reflecting the importance of the architecture and the history of the campus.

In 1964 Arthur Miller's The Crucible became the first drama production to be staged at UEA with John Rhys Davies (later to appear in The Lord of the Rings trilogy), the drama society's first president. In the same decade, in 1965, Benjamin Britten was appointed music adviser for UEA. In 1967 he conducted the UEA Choir in a performance of his War Requiem. In 1968 there were two royal visits from Princess Margaret and the Queen who each came to tour the new university for the first time.

1970s

Malcolm Bradbury and Angus Wilson helped establish the first creative writing course in the UK. The School of Literature, Drama, and Creative Writing would later go on to produce successful authors including Sir Kazuo Ishiguro, Ian McEwan, Rose Tremain, John Boyne and Andrew Miller. In the same decade UEA:TV, under the name of Nexus, was formed and created student-made television. It operated for two hours a day over lunchtime. Concrete, the student newspaper was first officially launched in 1973, replacing Mandate which launched in 1965. Over the years students also enjoyed Phoenix, Can Opener, Mustard Magazine and Kett before Concrete re-launched in 1992.

In 1972 the Centre for Climatic Research opened, founded by climatologist Hubert Lamb. Also notable in the same year, architect Bernard Feilden helped the university win a Civic Trust Award for the design of the Square, the university's main social space. A year later work began on the university lake, or Broad, as it is more commonly referred to. It involved excavating  of gravel, which was arranged as part of a 'no money' deal where a local aggregate company took the gravel for free leaving with a landscaped body of water fed by the River Yare.

In the 1970s the School of Computing Sciences first opened at UEA, and the university started offering education degrees from Keswick Hall, a manor house owned by the Gurney family and situated on the outskirts of Norwich. Initially this was only a postgraduate qualification, until the late 1970s when an undergraduate course was created. The gift of a collection of tribal art and 20th-century painting and sculpture, by artists such as Francis Bacon and Henry Moore, from Sir Robert Sainsbury and Lady Lisa Sainsbury resulted in the construction of the striking Sainsbury Centre for Visual Arts at the western end of the main teaching wall, one of the first major works of architect Norman Foster. The UEA's School of Fine Art opened in the same year of 1978.

1980s

In 1984 the School of Law first moved to Earlham Hall. The building, dating back to 1580, was once home to many famous residents including Elizabeth Fry and the Gurney family.

In 1986 the Climatic Research Unit (CRU) was opened within the Hubert Lamb Building. It had been named after Lamb who retired from the university in 1978. In 1988, as part of the university's 25th anniversary celebrations, Prince Charles visited the CRU building.

In 1989 the British Centre for Literary Translation was founded by WG Sebald, and The Arthur Miller Centre for American Studies was set up to encourage and facilitate the study of the United States. Arthur Miller later in 2000 went on to spend his 85th birthday at UEA when he was made an honorary graduate. In the same year Kazuo Ishiguro won the Booker Prize and became one of three UEA graduates who would receive the award, along with Ian McEwan and Anne Enright.

1990s

In 1990 the student radio station Livewire1350AM launched, completing the university's student media collective of print, television, and radio. It was opened by Radio 1 DJ John Peel and is now said to be one of the longest running student radio stations in the country. In 1993 the Union of UEA Students took over the management of The Waterfront, a music venue and nightclub. It has hosted performers including Pulp, Radiohead, Arctic Monkeys, Marina and the Diamonds and Amy Winehouse.

In 1994 the Queen returned to UEA to open the Queen's Building, which hosts a number of classes within the School of Health Sciences. A year later in 1995 the Elizabeth Fry building was opened, providing new facilities for almost 800 students.

2000s
In 2000 UEA's reputation within the field of environmental research led to the government choosing the university as the site for the Tyndall Centre for Climate Change Research. The centre, named after the 19th-century UK scientist John Tyndall, brings together scientists, economists, engineers and social scientists from eight partner institutions.

In 2001 the Sportspark, a multi-sports facility built thanks to a £14.5 million grant from the Sport England Lottery Fund, was formally opened by Princess Anne and brought international sporting facilities to Norwich. The Sportspark houses an Olympic-sized pool, floodlit astro-pitches, and the tallest climbing wall in Norfolk.

In the same year UEA alumnus Sir Paul Nurse was awarded the Nobel Prize for Medicine. He won the prize jointly with Timothy Hunt and Leland Hartwell "for their discoveries of key regulators of the cell cycle".

In 2002 UEA's Medical School opened with 110 students enrolled. The school is a collaboration with the Norfolk and Norwich University Hospital and world-class research centres now part of the Norwich Research Park. In 2003 the School of Pharmacy opened, along with the Zuckerman Institute for Connective Environmental Research (ZICER). The walkways, the Teaching Wall, and Ziggurats also gained Grade II listed status following a government consultation.

In 2004 the University of East Anglia was first represented on long-running TV quiz show University Challenge. The university's best performance on the show was in December 2012 when four high-profile alumni took part in a special series, coming second in the final against New College, Oxford.

In 2005 the university, in partnership with the University of Essex and with the support of Suffolk County Council, the East of England Development Agency, Ipswich Borough Council, and the Learning and Skills Council, secured £15 million funding from the Higher Education Funding Council for England for the creation of a new campus in the Waterfront area of Ipswich, called University Campus Suffolk or UCS. The campus opened in September 2007. In May 2016 it became independent of the UEA and was renamed to the University of Suffolk.

In 2006 the university opened Victory House, named after Lord Nelson's ship. The event took place on the anniversary of Lord Nelson's birth by his descendant Lord Walpole.

In 2008 INTO University Partnerships opened a £35m six-storey building named INTO University of East Anglia with 415 en-suite study-bedrooms and classroom space for 600 students. The institution, which works closely with UEA, focuses on the provision of foundation courses for international students, including English language, especially English for academic purposes. Shortly after opening, similar partnerships were created between INTO and Exeter and Newcastle.

In November 2009, computer servers at the university's Climatic Research Unit were hacked and the stolen information made public.  Over 1,000 emails, 2,000 documents, and source code were released.  Because the Climate Research Unit is a major repository for data regarding man-made global warming, the release, which occurred directly prior to the 2009 United Nations Climate Change Conference, attracted international attention and led to calls for an inquiry, with the controversy gaining the nickname "climategate". As a result, no fewer than eight investigations were launched in both the UK and US, but none found evidence of fraud or scientific misconduct, and the academics were subsequently fully exonerated.

2010s
In 2010 the Thomas Paine Study Centre was opened by playwright Trevor Griffiths. Named after the local luminary and visionary thinker, the building became home to the Norwich Business School. In 2012 the university won its second Queen's Anniversary Prize for its distinguished creative writing programme, having won one previously for its School of International Development. The award helped bolster the region's reputation as a literary hub, and helped Norwich to achieve its status as England's first UNESCO City of Literature in 2012.

In 2013 the university celebrated its 50th anniversary, ranking Number 1 in the Times Higher Education Magazine Student Experience league table. It was in this year UEA also launched its first free Massive open online course (MOOC) in partnership with Future Learn. Topics covered by UEA's Moocs over the years have included branding, screenwriting, environmental justice and food fraud.

In 2014 UEA opened its most environmentally-friendly building yet, Crome Court, which has won a number of awards for sustainability. Also in 2014 part of the campus was used for location filming as the Avengers new HQ during filming of the Avengers: Age of Ultron. The Sainsbury Centre for Visual Arts at UEA doubles as the home of the Avengers in Age of Ultron, Ant-Man, Captain America: Civil War and Spider-Man: Homecoming Robert Downey Jr. was spotted on the grounds during filming in 2014 and a number of students were employed as extras.

In 2015 'Britain's Greenest Building', The Enterprise Centre, opened on campus, helping the university win further awards for its environmental credentials. Also in 2015 parts of campus played host to Radio 1's Big Weekend which was officially located at Earlham Park. International acts including Fall Out Boy, Muse, Foo Fighters and Taylor Swift performed. Swift used the grounds at Earlham Hall as her dressing room.

In late September 2016 two new accommodation blocks opened. Barton House and Hickling House were named after two of the Norfolk Broads and have increased the number of rooms available to new students. In this year the Vice-Chancellor David Richardson unveiled a '2030 vision' which includes a £300m investment in campus – refurbishing existing buildings as well as building new teaching and learning spaces.

In January 2017 Queen Elizabeth II visited UEA campus to attend the latest exhibition at the Sainsbury Centre for Visual Arts. This was the Queen's third visit (she also visited in 1968 and 1994), and was the eighth visit by the Royal Family to the institution.

2020–present 
During the COVID-19 pandemic in May 2020, the university gave empty student accommodation to NHS staff, allowing them to isolate from at-risk family members and to avoid commuting.

In June 2021 plans for a BBC film documenting the 2009 CRU email controversy were announced, featuring Jason Watkins playing the role of climatologist Phil Jones. It was shot on location at the university. The film, The Trick, aired on 18 October 2021.

The university made a £74 million loss in the financial year ending 31 July 2022 (financial year 2021-22).  The university's income was £295.5m, but it spent £370.0m (48% on staff costs, 16% on person scheme provision, 26% other costs, 8% depreciation, and 2% interest on loans).  The university expects to make a £34m loss in the financial year 2023-24, and predicts that by 2026-2027 it will be making a loss of £45m a year.  The university's teaching block, known as the Ladsun Wall, urgently requires major repairs; its condition is described as "deteriorating fast" and if repairs are not done it might have "to be closed permanently". High spending on preserving grade-II listed buildings, a failed London campus and biomass energy generator as well as lower than planned new student enrolments and higher student drop-outs have been blamed for the university's difficulties. The financial turmoil, alongside a previous vote of no-confidence by the UCU branch of East Anglia, led to the immediate resignation of Vice-Chancellor David Richardson on 27 February 2023 who had been the Vice-Chancellor for 10 years.

Campus

Features of the UEA campus include Earlham Hall, childhood home of Elizabeth Fry, which is now home to UEA Law School; the Sainsbury Centre for Visual Arts at the western end of the main teaching wall designed by Norman Foster to house the art collection of Sir Robert Sainsbury and Lady Lisa Sainsbury, it also features as the new avengers headquarters in Avengers: Age of Ultron, Ant Man and Marvel Cinematic Universe films; and Sportspark, a multi-sports facilities built in 2001 thanks to a £14.5 million grant from Sport England Lottery Fund.

The campus is regularly evolving, and now stretches across the Norwich Research Park with the Edith Cavell Building and the Bob Champion Research and Education Building considered part of its campus over by the Norfolk and Norwich University Hospital. Newest buildings on the campus include two new accommodation blocks, and the Enterprise Centre, said to be Britain's greenest building.

Other features include the large university lake or "broad" at the southern edge of campus and "The Square", a central outdoor meeting place flanked by concrete steps.

Accommodation blocks on the university campus include Constable Terrace, Nelson Court, and Britten, Paston, Colman, Victory, Kett and Browne Houses, and the University Village. Residences are named after Horatio Nelson, John Constable, Benjamin Britten, Jeremiah Colman, Horatio Nelson's ship , Robert Kett, Sir Thomas Browne and the Paston family, the authors of the Paston Letters. The Ziggurat accommodation blocks are Grade II listed. UEA's accommodation block, Crome Court, opened in September 2014, containing the university's most eco-friendly flats. Two new blocks; Hickling and Barton House (named after the broads) opened in September 2016.

Facilities on campus include the Union Pub and Bar, a 24-hour library, a concert and gig venue called the LCR (Lower Common Room), a canteen called the Campus Kitchen, a café/coffee shop called the Blend, a bar/coffee shop called Unio, a graduate bar called the Scholar's Bar and The Street with a 24-hour launderette, the Union shop, and a coffee shop called Ziggy's.  Most of these are situated in the centre of the campus, next to the Square. Other food establishments situated on campus include Café 57 and the Bio Cafe. There is also a medical centre, dentist, and pharmacy, located on the eastern side of the campus.

The campus is linked to the city centre and railway station by frequent buses, operated by First Norfolk & Suffolk, via Unthank Road or Earlham Road. Other transport links include First buses to the Norfolk and Norwich University Hospital and to Bowthorpe, as well as Konectbus services to Watton, Dereham and Costessey via park and ride. National Express provides coach services to London, and Megabus operates low cost intercity travel to cities including Cambridge, Birmingham, Bristol and Cardiff.

Academic profile

The postgraduate Master of Arts in creative writing, founded by Sir Malcolm Bradbury and Sir Angus Wilson in 1970, is regarded as the most respected in the United Kingdom, and admission to the programme is competitive. The course has gone on to produce a number of distinguished authors, including Sir Kazuo Ishiguro, Ian McEwan, Anne Enright, Tash Aw, Andrew Miller, Owen Sheers, Tracy Chevalier, Trezza Azzopardi, Panos Karnezis and Suzannah Dunn. The German émigré novelist W. G. Sebald also taught in the School of Literature and Creative Writing, and founded the British Centre for Literary Translation, until his death in a car accident in 2001. Experimental novelist Alan Burns was the university's first writer-in-residence.

The Climatic Research Unit, founded in 1972 by Hubert Lamb in the School of Environmental Sciences, has been an early centre of work for climate change research. The school was also stated to be "the strongest in the world" by the chief scientific adviser to the UK government, Sir David King, during a lecture at the John Innes Centre in 2005.

Admissions

East Anglia had the joint 25th highest average entry qualification for undergraduates of any UK university in 2015, with new students averaging 407 UCAS points, equivalent to just below ABBbc in A-level grades. According to the 2017 Times and Sunday Times Good University Guide, approximately 10.5% of East Anglia's undergraduates come from independent schools.
In 2014 the ratio of applications to acceptances was 5.9 to 1. In 2015/16 the proportion of students admitted to the university from independent schools was 10.5%.

Rankings and reputation

The results of the Research Excellence Framework (REF 2021), published on 12 May 2022, showed that over 91% of the university's research activity was deemed to be "world leading" or "internationally excellent" with  more than 47% having the highest category of 4* of World Leading Research, significantly higher that the national average of 41%. UEA was ranked 13th in the UK for the quality of its research outputs and 20th overall amongst all mainstream British institutions – a rise of 9 places since the last assessment in 2014.

The university ranks in the world top 1% according to the Times Higher Education world rankings 2015/16 and within the world top 100 for research excellence in the Leiden Ranking 2016.

In 2012 the university was named the 10th best university in the world under 50 years old, and third best within the United Kingdom. In national league tables the university has most recently been ranked 18th in the UK by The Times and Sunday Times, and 14th by The Complete University Guide.

In April 2013 the university was ranked number one for student experience according to Times Higher Education Magazine. It currently ranks Top 3 for student satisfaction in the National Student Survey when ranking mainstream English universities. UEA is the only institution to rank top five since the survey began.

Organisation

Faculties and schools

The university offers over 300 courses in its four faculties, which contain 26 schools of study:

Faculty of Arts and Humanities
 Art, Media and American Studies
 History
 Interdisciplinary Institute for the Humanities
 Literature, Drama and Creative Writing 
 Politics, Philosophy and Language and Communication Studies

Faculty of Medicine and Health Sciences
 Norwich Medical School
 Health Sciences

Faculty of Science
 Actuarial Sciences
 Biological Sciences
 Biochemistry
 Chemistry
 Computing Sciences
 Engineering
 Environmental Sciences
 Geography
 Mathematics
 Natural Sciences
 Pharmacy
 Physics

Faculty of Social Sciences
 Economics
 Education and Lifelong Learning
 International Development
 UEA Law School 
 Norwich Business School
 Psychology
 Social Work

Student life

All students of the university and some INTO UEA students automatically become members of the union, but do have the right to opt out of membership. Membership confers the ability to take part in the union's activities such as clubs and societies, and being involved in the democratic processes of the union. The union is a democratic organisation run by its members via an elected student officer committee and student council. It is affiliated to the National Union of Students.

The UEA Student Union has over 200 sports clubs and societies ranging from men's and women's football clubs, a British Universities American Football League (BUAFC) Premier South Division American Football Team, The UEA Pirates, and cheerleading society to a Quidditch team. The UEA Media Collective encompasses the student newspaper Concrete, UEA:TV (previously named Nexus UTV) and the student radio station Livewire 1350AM. One of its more famous former presenters and managers is Greg James, the BBC Radio 1 presenter.

The UEA Student Union brings together the student community through its events like Pimp My Barrow, which was an annual fundraising event for The Big C, and involves ingeniously decorated wheelbarrows from 2006 to 2018. It has raised more than £50,000 for the Norfolk charity. The annual Derby Day sports event sees UEA take on the University of Essex in approximately 40 sports. UEA has won the Derby Day trophy all seven times since 2013.

The UEA Student Union also organises gigs and club nights at the Nick Rayns LCR, or Lower Common Room in Union House. The LCR is home to hundreds of music gigs every year. The students' union also runs the Waterfront venue, off campus in Norwich's King Street. Acts to have performed at these venues include Captain Beefheart, The Cure, Coldplay, Pere Ubu U2, Haim, The Smiths, Red Hot Chili Peppers, and Iron Maiden.  The UEA Gig List is a rather complete listing of the artists who have performed at UEA since 1963 and is published as a book by the UEA Gig History Project and illustrated with posters, photographs and ticket stubs. The Project was awarded a Council for Advancement and Support of Education (CASE) award in 2018 for engagement with alumni.

The union also operates a number of other services within Union House. This includes the Union Pub and Bar, Scholar's Bar, and Unio. Its building underwent a refurbishment in 2015 after a £6 million investment from the university.
Catering within UEA is managed by an inhouse team, led by executive head chef Michael Avis.

Public events
The university's lecture theatres regularly host film screenings, discussions, lectures and presentations for the public to attend.

UEA Literary Festival
The university hosted its inaugural literary festival in 1991 and has welcomed notable speakers including Madeleine Albright, Martin Amis, Martin Bell, Alan Bennett, Cherie Blair, Melvyn Bragg, Eleanor Catton, Richard Dawkins, Alain de Botton, Sebastian Faulks, Niall Ferguson, Stephen Fry, Frank Gardner, Richard E. Grant, Germaine Greer, Seamus Heaney, Clive James, P. D. James, Doris Lessing, Mario Vargas Llosa, Hilary Mantel, Iris Murdoch, Rageh Omaar, Michael Palin, Jeremy Paxman, Harold Pinter, Stephen Poliakoff, Terry Pratchett, Salman Rushdie, Simon Schama, Will Self, John Simpson, Zadie Smith, Paul Theroux, Peter Ustinov, Shirley Williams and Robert Winston.

Notable people

Alumni

UEA alumni in the sciences include the 2001 Nobel Prize in Physiology or Medicine laureate and former President of the Royal Society Sir Paul Nurse (PhD, 1973); the 2020 Nobel Prize in Physiology or Medicine winning co-discoverer of Hepatitis C and of the Hepatitis D genome Sir Michael Houghton (Biological Sciences, 1972); vaccinologist Dame Sarah Gilbert (Biological Sciences, 1983) who designed the Oxford–AstraZeneca COVID-19 vaccine, Dame Emily Lawson (PhD, 1993) who leads the NHS COVID-19 vaccine programme, Darwin Medal, Darwin–Wallace Medal and Erwin Schrödinger Prize winning evolutionary biologist Nick Barton (PhD, 1979); Potamkin Prize winning pathologist Karen Duff (Biological Sciences, 1987); climate scientists Tim Lenton, Chris Turney, Neil Adger, Benjamin D. Santer, Timothy Osborn, Keith Briffa, Sarah Raper, and Peter Thorne; and the Fellows of the Royal Society James Barber, Keith Beven, Mervyn Bibb, Lucy Carpenter, Richard Flavell, Don Grierson, Brian Hemmings, Terence Rabbitts, and Nick Talbot.

Literary alumni include the 2017 Nobel Prize in Literature laureate Sir Kazuo Ishiguro (Creative Writing, 1980), renowned German writer W. G. Sebald (PhD, 1973), Booker Prize winners, Ian McEwan (Creative Writing, 1971), and Anne Enright (Creative Writing, 1988); Costa Book Award (formerly Whitbread Award) winners Dame Rose Tremain (Creative Writing, 1967), Andrew Miller (Creative Writing, 1991), David Almond (English Literature, 1993), Tash Aw (Creative Writing, 2003), Emma Healey (Creative Writing, 2011), Susan Fletcher (Creative Writing, 2002), Adam Foulds (Creative Writing, 2001), Avril Joy (History of Art, 1972) and Christie Watson (Creative Writing, 2009); and the Caine Prize winners Binyavanga Wainaina (MPhil, 2010), Helon Habila (PhD, 2008) and Henrietta Rose-Innes (PhD). Other alumni include Tracy Chevalier (Creative Writing, 1994), John Boyne (Creative Writing, 1996), Neel Mukherjee (Creative Writing, 2001), Mick Jackson (Creative Writing, 1992), Trezza Azzopardi (Creative Writing, 1998), Paul Murray (Creative Writing, 2001), James Scudamore (Creative Writing, 2006), Mohammed Hanif (Creative Writing, 2005), Richard House (PhD, 2008), Sebastian Barker (English Literature, 1970), Clive Sinclair (BA, 1969; PhD, 1983), Kathryn Hughes (Creative Writing, 1986), Peter J. Conradi, and Craig Warner (Creative Writing, 2014).

Alumni in international politics and government include the current King of Tonga Tupou VI (Development Studies, 1980) who also served as Prime Minister from 2000 to 2006 and Foreign Minister from 1998 to 2004; Governor General of Grenada Sir Carlyle Glean (Education, 1982); Governor of Gibraltar Sir Robert Fulton (Social Sciences, 1970) who was formerly Commandant General Royal Marines; Kiribati Vice President Teima Onorio (Education, 1990); Turkish Deputy Prime Minister Murat Karayalçın (Development Economics, 1977) who also served as Foreign Minister; Finance Ministers of Australia (Mathias Cormann), South Africa (Tito Mboweni), Rwanda (Donald Kaberuka, later President of the African Development Bank), Uganda (Syda Bbumba), Thailand (Suchart Thada-Thamrongvech), and Venezuela (Pedro Rosas Bravo); Foreign Ministers of Iceland (Össur Skarphéðinsson) and The Gambia (Ousman Jammeh); Defence Minister of The Maldives Adam Shareef; current Mongolian Culture Minister Nomin Chinbat and Democratic Republic of the Congo Budget Minister Aimé Boji; and former Cabinet Ministers of Cyprus (Marios Demetriades), Peru (Gino Costa), South Sudan (Agnes Kwaje Lasuba), Kenya (Hassan Wario), Egypt (Gamal El-Araby), Tanzania (Juma Ngasongwa), Rwanda (Daphrose Gahakwa), Ethiopia (Sinknesh Ejigu and Junedin Sado), Seychelles (Rolph Payet and Peter Sinon), Turkey (Cüneyd Düzyol), Brunei (Suyoi Osman and Adanan Yusof) and Yemen (Yahya Al-Mutawakel).

Alumni in UK politics include the Labour Members of Parliament Rachael Maskell (Physiotherapy, 1994), and Karin Smyth (Politics, 1988); two former Leaders of the House of Lords, Valerie Amos, Baroness Amos (Applied Research in Education, 1978), and Thomas Galbraith, 2nd Baron Strathclyde (Modern Languages & European Studies, 1982); and the Liberal Democrat peer Rosalind Scott, Baroness Scott of Needham Market (European Studies, 1999). UEA is also the alma mater of the former Crossbench peer Timothy Bentinck, 12th Earl of Portland (History of Art, 1975); and the former Members of Parliament Caroline Flint (American Literature, History & Film, 1983), Douglas Carswell (History, 1993), Tony Colman (International Development), Jon Owen Jones (Ecology, 1975), Tess Kingham (Education), Judith Chaplin and Ivor Stanbrook (Law, 1995).

In the arts alumni include the actors Matt Smith (Drama, 2005), John Rhys-Davies, Jack Davenport (English & American Literature, 1995), James Frain (Drama, 1990), and Roger Ashton-Griffiths (PhD, 2015); comedians Paul Whitehouse, Charlie Higson (English & American Literature), Simon Day (Drama, 1989), Arthur Smith (Comparative Literature, 1976), and Nina Conti (Philosophy, 1995); film director Gurinder Chadha (Development Economics, 1983); art historians Philip Mould (History of Art, 1981), Bendor Grosvenor (PhD, 2009), and Paul Atterbury (Archaeology & Landscape History, 1972); Chief Executive of the Royal Opera House Mary Allen (Creative Writing, 2003); Chief Executive of English National Opera Séan Doran (Music 1983); BAFTA award-winning production designer Don Homfray (History, 1999), and the Emmy Award winning choirmaster Gareth Malone (Drama, 1997).

Alumni in the media include news correspondents Mark Stone (History of Art and Architecture, 2001), Stuart Ramsay, Razia Iqbal (American Studies, 1985), Geraint Vincent (History, 1994), David Grossman (Politics, 1987), and Selina Scott (English & American Literature, 1972); Radio 1 presenter Greg James (Drama, 2007) and Radio 4 newsreader and author Zeb Soanes (Drama 1997); political commentator Iain Dale (German & Linguistics, 1985); journalists Christina Patterson and Emily Sheffield; BBC executives Dame Jenny Abramsky (English), Jonathan Powell (English Literature), and James Boyle; and the weather forecasters Darren Bett (Environmental Sciences, 1989) and Penny Tranter (Environmental Sciences, 1982).

UEA alumni in business and economics include the Argentine billionaire businessman and real estate developer Eduardo Costantini, Hong Kong billionaire Billy Kan, the founders of Autonomy (David Tabizel) and Café Rouge (Karen Jones), and CEOs of Computacenter, ICI, Jaguar Land Rover, Premier Foods, Diageo, and Punch Taverns. UEA is also the alma mater of the explorer Benedict Allen (Environmental Sciences, 1981); England rugby player Andy Ripley; and the football commentator Martin Tyler (Sociology, 1967).

Academics

UEA has benefited from the services of academics at the top of their fields, including Sir Malcolm Bradbury and Sir Angus Wilson who co-founded the MA in Creative Writing programme; Hubert Lamb who founded the Climatic Research Unit; Lord Zuckerman who was influential in the establishment of the School of Environmental Sciences; Nobel Prize–winning chemist Richard Synge, who was an honorary professor; scientists Sir David King, Sir David Baulcombe, Jenni Barclay, Tom Wigley, Godfrey Hewitt, Michael Balls, Andrew Watson, Christopher Lamb, Alan Katritzky, Jean Palutikof, John Plane, Michael Gale, Roy Markham, Geoffrey Boulton, Johnson Cann, Hans Joachim Schellnhuber, John Alwyne Kitching, Thomas Bennet-Clark, Jeremy Greenwood and Tracy Palmer; mathematician Peter Chadwick; writers Angela Carter and Sarah Churchwell; poet George Szirtes; poet laureate Sir Andrew Motion historians Sir Richard Evans, Paul Kennedy, Patricia Hollis and Michael Balfour; art historians Peter Lasko and Eric Fernie; historian Stephen Church; philosophers Martin Hollis and Andreas Dorschel; psychologist Dame Shirley Pearce; musician Sir Philip Ledger; political scientists Lord Williams of Baglan and Sir Steve Smith; former Greek Finance Minister Yanis Varoufakis, and the High Court Judges Sir Clive Lewis and Dame Beverley Lang.

Present faculty include former IPCC Chairman Sir Robert Watson; scientists Sophien Kamoun, Corinne Le Quéré, Sir David Hopwood, Phil Jones, Jonathan D. G. Jones, Enrico Coen, Frederick Vine and Peter Liss; 
sociologist Sir Tom Shakespeare, 3rd baronet; writers Ian Rankin, Giles Foden, Amit Chaudhuri, and Christopher Bigsby; as well as the former Home Secretary Charles Clarke and LBC Radio presenter Iain Dale

Chancellors

 Harold Mackintosh, 1st Viscount Mackintosh of Halifax (1962–1964)
 Oliver Franks, Baron Franks (1965–1984)
 Owen Chadwick (1984–1994)
 Sir Geoffrey Allen (1994–2003)
 Sir Brandon Gough (2003–2012)
 Dame Rose Tremain (2013–2016)
 Karen Jones (2016–present)

Vice-Chancellors
 Frank Thistlethwaite (1961–1980)
 Sir Michael Thompson (1980–1986)
 Derek Burke (1987–1995)
 Dame Elizabeth Esteve-Coll (1995–1997)
 Vincent Watts (1997–2002)
 Sir David Eastwood (2002–2006)
 Bill MacMillan (2006–2009)
 Edward Acton (2009–2014)
 David Richardson (2014–2023)

See also 
Armorial of UK universities
List of universities in the United Kingdom
Plate glass university

References

Further reading
 Dormer, P. and Muthesius, S. (2002) Concrete and Open Skies: Architecture at the University of East Anglia, 1962–2000. Unicorn Press.
 Sanderson, M. (2002) The History of the University of East Anglia, Norwich. Hambledon Continuum.

External links 

 University of East Anglia
 Union of UEA Students
 Scholarships Available in The University of East Anglia

 
Educational institutions established in 1963
1963 establishments in England
Grade II* listed buildings in Norfolk
Universities established in the 1960s
Universities UK
Ziggurat style modern architecture